.tk is the Internet country code top-level domain (ccTLD) for Tokelau, a territory of New Zealand in the South Pacific.

Overview
Tokelau allows any individual to register domain names. Users and small businesses may register any number of domain names free of charge (with some restrictions). In addition to the name itself, users can opt to forward their web traffic using HTML frames and their email traffic, with a maximum of 250 addresses per user log in, or use full DNS, either via their own or third-party servers, or by using Dot TK's servers. There are content restrictions for free domains, banning sites containing sexual content, drug use, hate speech, firearms, and spam or copyright infringement. Dot TK requires free domains to have a regular traffic of visitors, and if a domain's redirect target does not work (even temporarily) the domain is taken offline. If a domain violates any of these terms, it is replaced by a Sedo advertisement page, and no advance warning is given.

Dot TK also provides .tk websites with the option to join a network called TiKinet, a close-knit network that links sites to each other based on keywords called TiKilinks. The network is expected to increase traffic to the websites, many of which are personal sites and blogs operated by individuals who otherwise would have no way to advertise their sites.

To be able to get a "special" .tk domain name the user must buy it. This includes trademark domain names for most Fortune 500 companies and common dictionary terms. Paid domain names cost US$19.90 for the first two years. Potentially valuable names with fewer than 4 characters are similarly unavailable for free registration and must generally be purchased at a premium price of over $1000.

Dot TK launched a new service called TweaK for Twitter users in April 2010, offering a URL shortening service that uses less space than many others, and for Facebook where the user can rename Facebook account pages with a .tk name.

In 2016, Nominet released a world map where each country was resized according to the popularity of its top-level domain. The .tk domain ranked first worldwide with 31,311,498 registered domain names (China (.cn) ranked 2nd with 16,810,737 registered domain names). The revenues from the .tk top-level domain business represent about 1/6 of the island's annual income.

Abuse
In 2006, McAfee conducted a survey in which they claim out of the 95 percent most trafficked web sites, .tk domains were twice as likely as the global average to be used for "unwanted behaviours", including scams such as phishing and spam. However, in 2008 McAfee reported that the threat of scams like phishing and spam was significantly reduced with .tk and that other top level domains such as .com and .net were much more used in such scams.

A 2011 report by the Anti Phishing Working Group blamed Tokelau's bad reputation on the registry Dot TK. It acquired the right to operate the top level domain and is responsible for the current free registration system. .tk domains logged 2533 of 11768 (~21.5%) total phishing attacks in the second half of 2010 Internet-wide.

A 2018 report by Michelle Base-Bursey stated that, "The third most prevalent TLD for phishing attacks is .tk, the country code for Tokelau, a territory north of New Zealand in the South Pacific."

On March 3, 2023, Meta filed a lawsuit against Freenom alleging cybersquatting violations and trademark infringement, and new domain registrations were halted. The lawsuit references a 2021 study on the abuse of domains conducted by Interisle Consulting Group, which discovered that the ccTLDs operated by Freenom made up five of the Top Ten TLDs most abused by phishers.

References

External links
 IANA .tk whois information
 .tk Registration

Country code top-level domains
Internet in Tokelau
Internet properties established in 1997
1997 establishments in Tokelau

sv:Toppdomän#T